The 1921 South Carolina Gamecocks football team represented the University of South Carolina during the 1921 Southern Intercollegiate Athletic Association football season. Led by second-year head coach Sol Metzger, the Gamecocks compiled an overall record of record of 5–1–2 with a mark of 2–1–1 in SIAA play.

Schedule

References

South Carolina
South Carolina Gamecocks football seasons
South Carolina Gamecocks football